Brousse-le-Château is a commune in the Aveyron department in southern France.

It has been honored as one of the most beautiful villages in France.

Population

See also
Communes of the Aveyron department

References

Communes of Aveyron
Aveyron communes articles needing translation from French Wikipedia
Plus Beaux Villages de France